Moland is a former municipality in the old Aust-Agder county, Norway.

Moland may also refer to:

People
 Arnfinn Moland (born 1951), Norwegian historian
 Hans Petter Moland (born 1955), Norwegian film director
 John Moland (c. 1700–1760), American lawyer
 Liv Marit Moland (1948–2008), Norwegian trade unionist and politician
 Tjostolv Moland (1981–2013), Norwegian army officer and security contractor
 Torstein Moland (born 1945), Norwegian economist

Places
 Moland, Telemark, a village in Fyresdal municipality, Vestfold og Telemark county, Norway
 Moland Church (disambiguation), a list of churches with the name Moland
 Moland House, an old stone farmhouse in Bucks County, Pennsylvania, US
 Moland, Minnesota, an unincorporated community
 Moland Township, Clay County, Minnesota

See also 
 
 Austre Moland, a former municipality in the old Aust-Agder county, Norway
 Vestre Moland, a former municipality in the old Aust-Agder county, Norway
 Molander (disambiguation)

Norwegian-language surnames